Bradley Helbig (born 28 February 1992) is an Australian rules footballer who played for the Richmond Football Club in the Australian Football League (AFL).

Originally from the West Adelaide Football Club in the South Australian National Football League (SANFL), Helbig was drafted to Richmond with their third selection, the forty-seventh overall, in the 2010 AFL draft.

Helbig made his AFL debut in Round 1, 2011 against Carlton at the MCG. In July 2011 he extended his contract until the end of the 2013 season.

Helbig was delisted by Richmond at the conclusion of the 2014 season He then returned to play for West Adelaide in 2015 and was named in the back pocket in the Bloods 2015 SANFL Grand Final team for their game against  at the Adelaide Oval on 27 September.

References

External links

Brad Helbig's statistics from Footy Wire

1992 births
Living people
Richmond Football Club players
Coburg Football Club players
West Adelaide Football Club players
Australian rules footballers from South Australia